Johan Okeiths Branger Engone (born 5 July 1993) is a professional footballer who plays as a midfielder for Championnat National 2 club Thonon Evian. Born in France, he is a former Gabon international.

Club career
Born in Sens, Branger spent his early career in France with Auxerre II, Raon-l'Étape, Sens and Dieppe. In July 2018 he signed for English club Oldham Athletic. He made his debut on 4 August 2018, in a League match against MK Dons. After leaving Oldham, he signed for Fréjus Saint-Raphaël in October 2020.

International career 
Branger made one international appearance for Gabon national team in 2012.

Honours 
Thonon Evian

 Championnat National 3: 2021–22

References

1993 births
Living people
French footballers
Gabonese footballers
French sportspeople of Gabonese descent
People with acquired Gabonese citizenship
Gabon international footballers
AJ Auxerre players
US Raon-l'Étape players
FC Sens players
FC Dieppe players
Oldham Athletic A.F.C. players
ÉFC Fréjus Saint-Raphaël players
Thonon Evian Grand Genève F.C. players
Association football midfielders
French expatriate footballers
Gabonese expatriate footballers
French expatriate sportspeople in England
Gabonese expatriate sportspeople in England
Expatriate footballers in England
Championnat National 2 players
Championnat National 3 players
English Football League players
Sportspeople from Sens
Footballers from Bourgogne-Franche-Comté
Black French sportspeople